The 1st Don Cossack Division was a Don Cossack cavalry division of the Russian Imperial Army.

Organization
1st Brigade
9th General-Adjutant Count Orlov-Denisov's Don Cossack Regiment            
10th General Lukovkin's Don Cossack Regiment
2nd Brigade
13th General-Field Marshal Prince Kutuzov of Smolensk's Don Cossack Regiment            
15th General Krasnov 1's Don Cossack Regiment

Commanders
20 April 1875 – ?  - Lieutenant General, adjutant general Ivan Ivanovich Shamshev
4 September 1879 – 16 September 1883  Lieutenant Colonel (after 30 April 1880 Colonel) Konstantin Yefimovich Przhevlotsky
1 September 1889 — 20 October 1893 Lieutenant General 
9 December 1893 — 20 August 1898 — Major General 
10 November 1898 – 5 August 1900  - Lieutenant General David Ivanovich Orlov
18 September 1900 – 6 May 1901  - Major General Ippolit Appolovich Pozdeyev 
1 February 1913 – after 1 April 1914  - Lieutenant General Aleksei Lvovich Vershinin     
18 July 1914 – 15 August 1914  - Lieutenant General Aglay Dmitriyevich Kuzmin-Korovaev            
15 August 1914 – 20 May 1916  - Major General (after 13 July 1915 Lieutenant General) Grigory Ivanovich Choglokov
13 June 1916 – ?   - Major General          
June 1917 – November 1917  - Major General Vladimir Petrovich Popov

Chiefs of Staff
4 September 1879 - 16 July 1883 — Colonel Konstantin Yefimovich Przhevlotsky
1883 - after 1 May 1884 — Colonel Lev Matveyevich Baykov
11 May 1884 - 1887 — Colonel Vladimir Ivanovich Giber fon Greynfenfels
8 April 1887 - 2 July 1893 — Colonel Pyotr Konstantinovich Vasilyev
2 July 1893 – 4 March 1894  - Colonel Valerian Alexandrovich Karandeyev       
6 March 1894 – 3 May 1898  - Colonel Mikhail Mikhailovich Pleshkov
13 June 1898 – 21 December 1899  - Colonel Eduard Karlovich von Klodt
22 February 1900 – 1 June 1904  - Colonel 
28 September 1904 - 28 October 1911 — Colonel Vladimir Ivanovich Marchenko
1 December 1911 - 12 August 1913 — Colonel Dmitry Yevdokimovich Nemov
8 December 1913 – 24 March 1915  - Lieutenant Colonel (after 6 December 1914 Colonel) Aleksandr Vasilyevich Benzengr        
June 1915 – 17 October 1915 - Colonel Viktor Zakharevich Savelyev
5 March 1916 - after 1 August 1916 — Colonel Vladimir Petrovich Popov
1917  - unknown - Captain Vasily Mikhailovich Azhogin

Commanders of the 1st Brigade
7 May 1877 - 30 December 1884 — Major General Nikolai Petrovich Yanov
10 April 1885 - 26 February 1886 — Major General Ivan Vasilyevich Ilovaysky
23 July 1886 - 8 April 1890 — Major General Pyotr Alekandrovich Leonov
2 April 1890 - 22 January 1894 — Major General Vasily Nikolayevich Turchaninov
22 January 1894 - 24 January 1900 — Major General Nikolai Matveyevich Kalinin
9 March 1900 - 25 November 1904 — Major General Nikolai Petrovich Ilovaysky
7 December 1904 - 20 January 1906 — Major General Pyotr Petrovich Grekov
18 May 1906 - 17 January 1910 — Major General 
17 February 1910 - 7 June 1911 — Major General Nikolai  Yakovlevich Dyakov
12 July 1911 - 11 September 1913 — Major General Ivan Ivanovich Kamennov
11 September 1913 - 9 November 1913 — Major General Nikanor Arkadyevich Lashchilin
18 December 1913 - 15 February 1916 — Major General Yefim Fyodorovich Kunakov
27 April 1916 - 26 March 1917 — Colonel Ivan Ivanovich Kryukov 
19 May 1917 — Colonel Ilya Maksimovich Tolokonnikov

Commanders of the 2nd Brigade
31 August 1875 - 7 May 1877 — Major General Viktor Alekseyevich Rodionov
23 February 1878 - 2 March 1889 — Major General Grigori Fyodorovich Chernozubov
8 April 1890 - 20 June 1890 — Major General Pyotr Aleksandrovich Leonov 
26 October 1890 - 19 August 1899 — Major General Nikolai Modestovich Yagodin
20 November 1899 - 12 June 1904 — Major General Ivan Andreyevich Luizov
25 June 1904 - 26 December 1911 — Major General Stepan Alekseyevich Boldyrev
14 January 1912 - 17 December 1913 — Major General Yefim Fyodorovich Kunakov
18 December 1913 - 6 October 1914 — Major General Konstantin Semyonovich Polyakov
6 October 1914 - 13 June 1916 — Major General 
22 October 1917 — ? — Colonel 
9 September 1916 - 22 October 1917 — Major General Boris Rostislavovich Khreshchatitsky

References

External links
 Страница на Regiment.ru

Sources
 Littauer, Vladimir. Russian Hussar. p. 220. .
 Albert Seaton, page 27 "The Cossacks", SBN 85045 116 7

Cavalry divisions of the Russian Empire
History of the Don Cossacks
Cossack military units and formations